Ayusan (foaled 21 February 2010) is a Japanese Thoroughbred racehorse and broodmare best known for her win in the 2013 Oka Sho. As a two-year-old she won on her debut before finishing second in the Artemis Stakes and seventh in the Hanshin Juvenile Fillies. In the following year she ran third the Tulip Sho before taking the Oka Sho and went on to finish fourth in the Yushun Himba. After failing in two starts in 2014 she was retired from racing.

Background
Ayusan is a bay mare with a white star and snip and four white socks bred in Japan by Shimokobe Farm. During her racing career she was owned by Juichi Hoshin and trained by Takahisa Tezuka. She was ridden in most of her races by Genki Maruyama.

She was from the third crop of foals sired by Deep Impact, who was the Japanese Horse of the Year in 2005 and 2006, winning races including the Tokyo Yushun, Tenno Sho, Arima Kinen and Japan Cup. Deep Impact's other progeny include Gentildonna, Harp Star, Kizuna, A Shin Hikari, Marialite and Saxon Warrior. Ayusan's dam Buy The Cat was a Kentucky-bred mare who won one minor race from three starts and was exported to Japan after being sold for $60,000 at Keeneland in November 2006. She was a descendant of the American broodmare Demolition, making her a distant relative of the St Leger winner Lucarno.

Racing career

2012: two-year-old season
Ayusan began her track career in a contest for previously unraced juveniles over 1400 metres at Tokyo Racecourse on 6 October and won from Hishi Last Guy and eleven others. Four weeks later at the same track she was stepped up in class and distance for the Listed Artemis Stakes over 1600 metres in which she finished a close second to Collector Item. Despite her defeat she was moved up to the highest class for the Grade 1 Hanshin Juvenile Fillies in December and came home seventh of the eighteen runners, four lengths behind the winner Robe Tissage.

In the Japanese Thoroughbred rankings for two-year-olds on Ayusan was given a rating of 104, making her the seventh-best filly of her generation, four pounds below the top-rated Robe Tissage.

2013: three-year-old season

On her three-year-old debut Ayusan started at odds of 12.6/1 for the Tulip Sho (a major trial race for the Oka Sho) over 1600 metres at Hanshin and finished third, beaten three and a half lengths and three quarters of a length by Kuforfune Surprise and Win Primera. Cristian Demuro took the ride (Maruyama was injured) when Ayusan started a 17/1 outsider for 73rd running of the Oka Sho at Hanshin on 7 April. Kurofune Surprise started favourite, while the other sixteen runners included Red Oval, Crown Rose (Fairy Stakes), Tosen Soleil, Meisho Mambo, Robe Tissage and Collector Item. Ayusan raced in mid-division before overcoming an obstructed run early in the straight to overtake the front-running Kurofune Surprise 200 metres from the finish. She repelled the late run of Red Opal to win by a neck with third place going to the 86/1 outsider Princess Jack.

At Tokyo on 19 May, with Maruyama in the saddle, Ayusan went off at odds of 5.5/1 for the Yushun Himba over 2400 metres. She finished fourth of the eighteen runners behind Meisho Mambo, Ever Blossom and Denim And Ruby.

In the Japanese Thoroughbred rankings for three-year-olds on turf Ayusan was given a rating of 110, making her the fourth-best filly of her generation, six pounds below the top-rated Denim And Ruby.

2014: four-year-old season
Ayusan remained in training as a four-year-old but made little impact in her two races. She finished last of the fifteen runners behind Just A Way in the Nakayama Kinen over 1800 metres in April and then ran eleventh in the following month at the same track in the Lord Derby Challenge Trophy, five lengths behind the winner Curren Black Hill.

Breeding record
Ayusan was retired from racing to become a broodmare. She has produced four foals:

Astrantia, a chestnut filly, foaled in 2016, sired by King Kamehameha. Unraced.
Applause Yu, bay filly, 2017, by Rulership. Failed to win in four races.
Upstream, bay filly, 2018, by King Kamehameha. Won two races.
Engidaruma, bay colt, 2019, by Rulership. Won one race.
Dolce More, bay colt, 2020, by Rulership. Won Asahi Hai Futurity Stakes.

Pedigree

References

2010 racehorse births
Racehorses bred in Japan
Racehorses trained in Japan
Thoroughbred family 9-f